Lake Aurora is a freshwater lake located in eastern Polk County, Florida. The depth of the lake as well as its crystal blue waters indicate that the lake was probably once a sinkhole which filled with water. The lake is in an area east of the Lake Wales Ridge dominated by scrub oak with occasional sandspur clearings. The lake is perhaps best known for being the home of the Lake Aurora Christian Camp and Retreat Center, a summer camp owned by Christian churches in the central Florida area.

References

External links
 Lake Aurora Christian Camp
 Lake Aurora listing at the Polk County Water Atlas
Aurora
Lake Wales, Florida